The Infantry Battle School, Brecon is a British Army training establishment at Dering Lines in Brecon, Wales.

History
The Infantry Battle School was established at Brecon in 1939 at the start of the Second World War. The Parachute Regiment formed a battle camp there in 1961 which was absorbed by the Tactical Training Wing of the School of Infantry in 1976. The School was further redeveloped in 1995. Training is provided for officers, warrant officers and non-commissioned officers by instructors who are rated in the top third by the British Army.

A sub-unit of the Brigade of Gurkhas, Gurkha Wing (Mandalay), is tasked with providing realistic OPFOR training for those at the IBS.

References

External links
Infantry Battle School

Brecon
Education in Powys
Installations of the British Army
Organisations based in Powys
Training establishments of the British Army